Barnes Lake may refer to a location in the United States:

Barnes Lake (Minnesota)
Barnes Lake (Washington)
Barnes Lake, Michigan, a community surrounding a lake of the same name